Ecological region may refer to:

A collection of ecological districts of New Zealand
Ecoregion, a geographically defined area that is smaller than an ecozone and larger than an ecosystem